The 2013 VMI Keydets football team represented the Virginia Military Institute in the 2013 NCAA Division I FCS football season. They were led by sixth year head coach Sparky Woods and played their home games at Alumni Memorial Field. They are a member of the Big South Conference. 2013 was VMI's final year as a member of the Big South, as they will move to the Southern Conference in 2014.

The season began with a 34–0 shutout defeat at the hands of Richmond on August 31. The Keydets achieved their first win of the year the following week by defeating Glenville State 34–27, thanks to a last second goal-line stand as time expired. After a 37–24 loss to Division II North Greenville, VMI would endure a 7-game losing streak, falling to Virginia, Robert Morris in double overtime, Charleston Southern, Presbyterian, Coastal Carolina, and Liberty.

The Keydets' losing streak was snapped on November 9 with a decisive 27–9 win over Gardner–Webb. This also saw the end of a 9-game conference losing streak. VMI then lost to The Citadel 31–10 in the Military Classic of the South, and ended the year with a 35–23 loss to the Bucknell Bison, finishing the year at 2–10 and 1–4 in Big South play. It was the third straight year VMI won only two games in a season.

Schedule

Source: Schedule

Game summaries

Richmond

Glenville State

North Greenville

Virginia

Robert Morris

Charleston Southern

Presbyterian

Coastal Carolina

Liberty

Gardner-Webb

The Citadel

Bucknell

References

VMI
VMI Keydets football seasons
VMI Keydets football